Deutsche Evangelische Oberschule (DEO) is an exclusive German school in Dokki, Giza, Egypt, in the Cairo metropolitan area. It is operated by the German Protestant community of Cairo.

History 
The initiative for a school was established by the Protestant congregation of Cairo. The school was built along with a rectory in the spring of 1873 on land given to the Prussian consul von Theremin by the Khedive Ismail. The language of instruction was French with 15 students attending. On 2 February 1878, there was a dispute about the school's ownership between the church and the school, which resulted in the school's becoming community owned and adding optional Arabic lessons. In 1880, the school further expanded to include 89 students in three classes. There were students of different nationalities with 28 Turks, 19 Egyptians, ten Italians, five Germans, five Swiss, five French, four Syrians, three English, three Scots, three Levantines and one each Austrian, Greek, Persian and Armenian. The school had students of different religions: 41 Muslim students, 19 Protestant, 14 Roman Catholic, seven Jewish, seven Coptic and one Greek Orthodox. After the English conquered Egypt in 1882, English courses were added to the school's curriculum. In 1908, the school was relocated to Boulaq with primary and secondary education facilities. A year later, their first "Einjährigenexamen" (a German secondary education exam) was made before the German examination committee.

Due to the First World War, students stopped going to school and by November 1914 the school was shut down. In 1920, England liquidated all the German properties including the community properties in Egypt. On 17 February 1930, the school was reopened with five students attending. In July 1933, the school was relocated to its old location. By 1939, the school had 13 classes with 130 students, but had to be closed again due to the start of the Second World War.

On 12 January 1953, the school was reopened with 18 students attending and the addition of a newly established kindergarten. The first director of the school was Artur Hachmeister. The school was than moved to Dr.-Mahmoud-Azmi-Straße 2 in Zamalek. The first "Reifeprüfung" (high school exam) was done by three female and three male students. On 1 October 1956, an Islam course was added to the school's curriculum which was required by the Egyptian government as of 26 June 1956. In 1957, Arabic was made a compulsory course for all students attending the school. The graduates of the school were eligible to attend Egyptian universities by January 1958. In 1959, the school's first Arabic division director, Auni Abder Rauf, was appointed. On 1 March 1977, the school was relocated to Dokki. In 2001, the school added a new course called "koeducative" religion for Muslim and Christian students.

Notable graduates 
 Michael Bochow, sociologist
 Samih Sawiris, entrepreneur
 Naguib Sawiris, entrepreneur
 Nassef Sawiris, entrepreneur
 Mohamed El-Sawy, engineer, politician
 Amr Hamzawy, political scientist, politician, publicist
 Tarek Kamel, Former Minister of Communications
 Aida el Ayoubi, singer, songwriter and guitarist
 Yasser Shaker, CEO of the French Telecom company Orange

Notable visitors 
On 22 March 1974, Germany's Chancellor Willy Brandt visited the school.
On 27 February 1978, Germany's Chancellor Helmut Schmidt visited the school.
In 1981, Egyptian president Anwar Sadat and his wife Jehan Sadat visited the school.
In October 1984, Germany's President Richard von Weizsäcker visited the school.
On 22 February 2000, Germany's President Johannes Rau visited the school.

References

External links 

Official Site (German)
Article about the cooperative religion (German)

Educational institutions established in 1873
Private schools in Cairo
International schools in Egypt
Schools in Giza
International schools in Greater Cairo
German international schools in Egypt
1873 establishments in Egypt